Aras Green Economic Dawn (abbreviated AGED or Aras GED) is a private consulting and trade company based in Aras, Iran. The company has a technocratic background with the slogan Build & Rebuild. The notability of the company comes from its trade and management of commercial genetically modified forests in Iran and for commercializing afforestation in Iran.

Establishment 
Aras Green Economic Dawn was formally established in 2016 to combine the research, logistical and sales activities of commercial afforestation in Iran which had been begun by Alireza Nasiri since 2009. In the same year the company established an internal department dedicated to formally consulting foreign partners in Iran.

Expansion 

The company quickly became an international firm after gaining foreign partnerships with companies in new industries in China, South Korea, and Free Trade Zones in Iran. Aras GED established a department for consulting large private and state owned enterprises on trade, investment and special joint projects in Iran which relate to industrial oil pumps, renewable energy, boats, railway projects and agriculture.

Addresses 
Aras GED is an Iranian company based out of Aras FTZ in Iran. The consulting office of Aras GED is based out of the top floor of the SUNIR Co building in Taleghani Avenue directly adjacent to the former American embassy in Tehran and close to the building of Ministry of Petroleum.

Forestation warranty 

In 2017 the company became the first to introduce an official green environment insurance/warranty for its commercial artificial forests in Iran to clients. The Bimeye Fazaye Sabz/Garantie Fazaye Sabz is a technology assisted tree tracking plan that will insure all of Aras GED's commercial forests and retail sales of genetically modified trees with a replacement program inside Iran. The program is the first such program in Iran and will encourage commercial afforestation in the country and create green assets for the country and Aras GED.

Consulting and representation 

Aras GED has been a consulting company to numerous corporations and organizations inside Iran and outside of Iran. Aras GED represented Shiraz Metro in the Shiraz Metro project in Fars Province for the joint venture project between Shiraz Metro and China Railway Construction Corporation.

References

Forest products companies
Agriculture companies of Iran